Abigail Knickerbocker Peck (born October 6, 1956) is an American rower. She competed at the 1984 Summer Olympics and the 1988 Summer Olympics.

Abby Peck was born Abigail Knickerbocker Peck and is the daughter of James and Rosamond Peck.

Peck graduated from Skidmore College, with an art degree in 1978.  She began rowing in college and later became a US National Team member from 1980 through 1988. Peck competed at the 1984 Olympics in quad sculls, and at the 1988 Olympics in the eight. She rowed at five World Championships (1982–83, 1985–87), winning a silver medal in the eight in 1987. She also competed at the 1986 Goodwill Games, winning silvers in both the quad sculls and the eights.

In her rowing career, Peck has won twelve gold medals, three silver medals and a bronze medal at the United States national championships. She has also won five medals at the international level.

After a back injury, Peck returned to school to earn a master's degree in exercise and sports science from Smith College. She worked with breast cancer survivors, teaching them to row, and brought together teams of cancer survivors to row in the Head of the Charles Regatta in Cambridge.

Peck started PAISBC (pronounced "Pays Back") in 2010, which stands for "Physical Activity Intervention Surviving Beyond Cancer".  PAISBC is a non profit in which Peck works with oncology patients at the Northeast Radiation Oncology Center. Peck has spoken passionately about her rowing career and how much it taught her. She has said that the journey was more important than any of the medals.

References

External links
 

1956 births
Living people
American female rowers
Olympic rowers of the United States
Rowers at the 1984 Summer Olympics
Rowers at the 1988 Summer Olympics
Sportspeople from Scranton, Pennsylvania
Competitors at the 1986 Goodwill Games
21st-century American women